The DC Multiverse is a fictional continuity construct used in DC Comics publications. The Multiverse has undergone numerous changes and has included various universes, listed below between the original Multiverse and its successors.

The original Multiverse

Catalogued
Originally, there was no consistency regarding "numbered" Earths—they would be either spelled out as words or use numbers, even within the same story. For example, "Crisis on Earth-Three!" (Justice League of America #29 (August 1964)) uses "Earth-3" and "Earth-Three" interchangeably. However, a tradition of spelling out the numbers emerged in "The Most Dangerous Earth" (Justice League of America #30 (September 1964)). This convention was disregarded in Crisis on Infinite Earths, and it became common practice to refer to the various Earths with numerals instead. Infinite Crisis used both, but Crisis on Infinite Earths: Absolute Edition and everything after 52 have referred to the alternate universes with numerals.

Because 52 introduced another set of Earths, The Flash: Flashpoint changed the nature of many of those Earths. The New 52 and Convergence restored the Pre-Crisis Multiverse; all Pre-Crisis Earths below 52 are spelled out (i.e., Earth-Three), realities from the 52 Multiverse use a hyphen (Earth-3), and realities from the New 52 Multiverse use a space (i.e., Earth 3). This helps, as The New 52 introduced a Dark Multiverse that uses negative numbers (i.e., Earth -3).

Also, Earths that were "revealed as a distinct parallel Earth in The Kingdom #2", i.e., part of Hypertime, are marked with an asterisk. Variations of some of these worlds appeared in the 52 and New 52 Multiverses, which are also Hypertime realities.

Note that Wonder Woman met a duplicate version of herself coming from an unnamed twin Earth in "Wonder Woman's Invisible Twin", (Wonder Woman #59 (May–June 1953)). It was the first appearance of an alternate Earth in DC Comics.

Unclassified
Before the formal creation of its Multiverse, DC would use the "imaginary story" label to denote stories that did not fit and never were intended to fit into its canon—a tradition it would continue even after the creation of the Multiverse. Alan Moore's "What Ever happened to the Man of Tomorrow?" (Action Comics #583 and Superman #423) in 1986 was the last Pre-Crisis story to use the label.

By contrast, other stories were clearly intended to be canonical, but various details were wrong or there were stories told in other media that were never said not to be canonical. As a result, fans and editors would create other Earths to explain things like the Super Friends comic (set on what writers referred to as Earth-B).

Also there were many "one-shot" Earths (such as the Earth shown in "Superman, You're Dead, Dead, Dead" in Action Comics #399), for which few details were provided and would not be named until Crisis on Infinite Earths: Absolute Edition (November 2005) was published. Finally, not all alternate reality stories were assigned a name. These included (but were not limited to) the two-page "How Superman Would Win the War" (1940), the ancient Greece/ancient Israel mash-up world from Action Comics #308 (January 1964), the Earth where "The Super-Panhandler of Metropolis" and "The Secret of the Wheel-Chair Superman!" (Action Comics #396-397) take place, and some of the Earths seen in Superboy (vol. 4) #61-62.

DC's one universe, one timeline idea was silently killed off with the creation of the pocket universe (which was to explain why the Legion of Super-Heroes still remembered a Superboy when none existed in the Post-Crisis reality). The Official Crisis on Infinite Earths Index (March 1986) and The Official Crisis on Infinite Earths Crossover Index (July 1986) formally canonized the "Crossover Earth" where the Marvel and DC characters co-existed, making multiverse-changing events problematic at best. Then, you had parallel universes (like that of the Extremists) where the counterpart of Earth had a different name, as well as the realities of the Darkstars and Justice League series.

Crisis on Infinite Earths: Absolute Edition (November 2005) formally canonized and named many imaginary tales, the Tangent Comics universe and some Elseworlds as part of the Pre-Crisis Multiverse, even though some (such as the pocket universe) had clearly existed after the Crisis.

In the "With A Vengeance!" storyline in Superman/Batman, the Multiverse is visited by Bizarro and Batzarro. The Joker and Mr. Mxyzptlk summon Batmen and Supermen from various realities, both previously established worlds as well as unexplored ones.

Convergence retroactively prevented the destruction of the original DC Multiverse, so all the Pre-Crisis earths exist but in an "evolved" form, though all characters in continuity or canon can be used by writers.

The 52 Multiverse
A new Multiverse was revealed at the end of the 52 weekly maxiseries. Unlike the original Multiverse, which was composed of an infinite number of alternate universes, this Multiverse is composed of a predetermined number of alternate universes, which were originally referred to as New Earth and Earths 1 through 51, although erroneously in Tangent: Superman's Reign #1, New Earth is referred to as Earth-1; however, in Final Crisis: Superman Beyond #1, New Earth is instead designated Earth-0. Dan Didio has since explicitly denied that New Earth is Earth-1. The alternate universes were originally identical to New Earth and contained the same history and people until Mister Mind "devoured" portions of each Earth's history, creating new, distinct Earths with their own histories and people, such as the Nazi-themed version of the Justice League that exists in Earth-10. Each of the alternate universes have their own parallel dimensions, divergent timelines, microverses, etc., branching off of them.

The Guardians of the Universe serve as protectors of the new Multiverse. Each universe within the Multiverse is separated by a Source Wall, behind which the Anti-Life Equation keeps the universes apart. The Bleed permeates the Anti-Life Equation in unpredictable places behind the Source Wall, allowing for transport between the universes. The destruction of New Earth would set off a chain reaction that would destroy the other 51 alternate universes at the same time, leaving only the Antimatter Universe in existence. As a consequence of Alexander Luthor, Jr.'s attempts to recreate the Multiverse, 52 new Monitors were created to oversee the 52 universes created afterwards. The Monitors seek to protect the Multiverse from people who crossover from one alternate universe to another, through the Bleed or through innate ability, who the Monitors have labeled "anomalies".

A partial list of some of the alternate universes that make up the new Multiverse was revealed in late November 2007.

The Multi-Multiverse

The New 52 and DC Rebirth
The Flashpoint story arc ended with a massive change to the Multiverse; to what extent it is entirely new, and to what extent it is as it was formed in the wake of 52, has not fully been established. Some worlds, like Earth-1 and Earth-23, appear to be entirely untouched, while others, like Earth-0, Earth-2, and Earth-16, have changed drastically. A number of worlds from the previous Multiverse were also reassigned; for example, Earth-31, originally the alternate Earth where Frank Miller's The Dark Knight Returns and All-Star Batman and Robin, the Boy Wonder is set, is now occupied by post-apocalyptic waterworld analogues of Batman and other DC staples. In July 2014, a map of the Multiverse was released, in promotion of Grant Morrison's The Multiversity series.

There are 52 Earths in the local Multiverse home to the DCU Prime Earth, though due to the time-traveling interventions of Brainiac, the Hal Jordan of the Pre-Zero Hour New Earth DCU, and Superman of the Pre-Flashpoint New Earth altering the course of the Crisis on Infinite Earths, an infinite number of universes from previous incarnations of the Multiverse exist beyond these 52. This new model of creation involves multiple incarnations of the Multiverse suspended within a "Multi-Multiverse", with individual Multiverses existing as 'bubble' sets of grouped universes, such as the local 52. In February 2018, the Dark Nights: Metal series disclosed the existence of an additional Earth within this context, populated by sapient metasimians. 

In Doomsday Clock #12 (2019) it was revealed, that previous incarnations of DC Universe, such as Pre-Crisis Earth-One and New 52's Prime Earth still exist as Earth-1985 and Earth-52, as a way of preserving every era of Superman. However, it is not known if these are part of the Multiverse, if they exist in Hypertime, or something else. 

In Dark Crisis (2022), Pariah engineers a revival of many Earths from the original Multiverse, and adds them to the current Multiverse, removing the 52-world cap.

The Multiverse-2
As it was mentioned in The Multiversity, this multiverse was destroyed by the Empty Hand. 

In Infinite Frontier, it is identified as the remnants of the pre-Crisis Multiverse. Pariah uses it to trap various members of the Justice League in private realities that supposedly represent their ideal worlds, as a sort of "honey trap". The only worlds listed here are Pariah's "prison worlds"; for all other Multiverse 2 worlds, see the original Multiverse.

The Dark Multiverse
The Dark Multiverse made its debut on DC's Dark Nights: Metal banner. Characters within this storyline are stated as originating from beyond the core New 52 Multiverse that has been depicted until now and contains Dark Knight Batman analogues of the Flash, Doomsday, Aquawoman, Green Lantern, Wonder Woman, Cyborg, and the Joker. Many of these Earths appear to be highly unstable and pre-apocalyptic, akin to the depiction of the Earths that were consumed during Crisis on Infinite Earths.

Worlds in the Dark Multiverse are designated with negative numbers.

Animated properties

The following list is for the Multiverse Earths that appear in the DC animated universe, the DC Universe Animated Original Movies and other animated properties

Television series

Smallville

Following the conclusion of Smallville, the series' story was continued in comic book form under the banner Smallville: Season 11. The series ran from 2012 to 2015.
{| class="wikitable"
|-
! scope="col" style="width:15%;"| Designation
! scope="col" style="width:20%;"| Inhabitants
! scope="col" style="width:40%;"| Notes
! scope="col" style="width:15%;"| First appearance
|- style="border-top: solid thick red"
! scope="row" | (unnamed)
| Characters from the television series Smallville
| 
 The main Earth of Smallville
| "Pilot"  (1.01)
|- style="border-top: solid thick red"
! scope="row" | (unnamed)
| 
| 
Kal-El's ship did not arrive on this Earth
Lex Luthor, as the President of the United States, ordered a nuclear war that destroyed most of the planet.
| "Apocalypse" (7.18)
|- style="border-top: solid thick red"
! scope="row" | (unnamed)
| Kal-El / Clark Luthor / Ultraman (Clark Kent's doppelgänger), and other doppelgängers of the Smallville characters
| 
Real designation unknown, informally referred to as "Earth-2", relative to the main Earth of Smallville
Kal-El was raised by Lionel Luthor instead of the Kents, growing up to be the powerful supervillain Ultraman

It was revealed in the comics that this Earth was later destroyed by the Monitors. Chloe Sullivan escaped to the main Earth of Smallville, but was later killed there by the Monitors
| "Luthor" (10.10)
|- style="border-top: solid thick red"
| colspan="4" style="text-align:center; background:#fe8484;"| Earths from the Smallville comics
|- style="border-top: solid thick red"
! scope="row" | Earth-9
| 
|
 This Earth was destroyed when it was torn apart in a collision with Earth-37, due to a Bleed quake caused by one of the Monitors
| Smallville Season 11: Alien #3 (April 2014; mentioned)
|- style="border-top: solid thick red"
! scope="row" | Earth-13
| Clark Kent, Bruce Wayne
| 
 On this Earth, Clark Kent was a human superhero-wannabe, while Bruce Wayne was a psychopathic killer. Earth-13's Clark traveled to the main Earth of Smallville, but was followed and killed by Bruce
 This Earth was destroyed when the collision between Earth-9 and Earth-37 broke through into Earth-13. Earth-13's Bruce Wayne remains its last survivor and is held prisoner on Mars in the main universe of Smallville
| Smallville Season 11: Alien #3 (April 2014; mentioned)
|- style="border-top: solid thick red"
! scope="row" | Earth-37
| 
| 
 This Earth was destroyed when it was torn apart in a collision with Earth-9, due to a Bleed quake caused by one of the Monitors
| Smallville Season 11: Alien #3 (April 2014; mentioned)
|- style="border-top: solid thick red"
! scope="row" | Earth-Majestic
| Kal-El / Mister Majestic (Clark Kent's doppelgänger), Henry James Olsen, Lois Lane
| 
 Real designation unknown, this Earth derives its name from the superhero Mister Majestic, the alternate version of Superman
 When visited by Smallville'''s Clark and Lois, this Earth was in the process of being destroyed by the Monitors
| Smallville Season 11: Chaos #2 (November 2014)
|- style="border-top: solid thick red"
! scope="row" | Earth-Omega
| 
|
 Real designation unknown, this Earth derives its name from the Omega symbol used by Darkseid 
 This Earth was attacked and seized by Darkseid when it collided with his home planet of Apokolips. It later faced a catastrophic battle against the Monitors that destroyed most of the planet.
| Smallville Season 11: Chaos #2 (November 2014)
|}

 Arrowverse 

 Pre-Crisis 
The CW television series Arrow received its first spin-off The Flash in 2014 with both set in the same fictional universe (Earth-1). The Flash's second season began to explore a shared multiverse with the appearance of Earth-2, while the series' titular character also crossed over with the parallel universe home to Supergirl (later designated Earth-38). Additional universes have either been visited or mentioned in dialogue in later seasons of the Arrowverse shows, and some older television series such as the 1990 The Flash series and films such as the 1989 Batman film have been retroactively incorporated into the Arrowverse multiverse as their own parallel universes (with the designation ending in the last two digits of the year it was released).

The 2019 crossover event titled "Crisis on Infinite Earths", inspired by the comic of the same name, destroyed all universes within the Arrowverse multiverse, both on- and off-screen.

The NBC series Powerless (2017), which aired alongside the Arrowverse series, has been informally referred to by its producers as existing on "Earth-P". Ezra Miller's Barry Allen from the DC Extended Universe makes a cameo appearance in "Crisis on Infinite Earths: Part Four".

 Post-Crisis 
At the end of "Crisis on Infinite Earths", a new multiverse was created, notably merging Earth-1, Earth-38, the Earth of Black Lightning, and the original Earth-2 into the new Earth-Prime as well as creating a new Earth-2. Guggenheim also confirmed the characters from Smallville who existed on the previous Earth-167 survived. Guggenheim had wanted there to only be the single, new Earth-Prime that remained at the end of the crossover, but had that happened, the crossover would not have been able to visit the worlds of other DC properties. A compromise was done, where these properties were put back to various Earths in the multiverse, and the Arrowverse series were combined to a single Earth.

DC Studios

Video games

 Injustice 

 Infinite Crisis 

A convergence of Multiverses
The end of the Convergence series resulted in the retroactive saving of the Pre-Crisis DC Multiverse. In an interview Jeff King stated, "The battle to save not one, but two multiverses in Convergence provides it", and later states "In Convergence #8 we reference Multiversity and show you some of the Post-Convergence worlds that make up the reconstituted DC Multiverse. In many ways, the number of Worlds is now infinite. There may even be more than one Multiverse.", as well as "Post-Convergence, every character that ever existed, in either Continuity or Canon, is now available to us as storytellers.". This leaves open the question of how (or even if) the Pre-Crisis, Hypertime, 52 and post-Flashpoint'' Multiverses interact.

References

 
 
Multiverse